Domino's Pizza Israel is the Israeli subsidiary of the pizza chain Domino's Pizza, run by master franchisee Elgad Pizza with 33 branches throughout Israel.

History
Domino's Pizza Israel was founded in 1990, and opened their first branch in Israel in 1993.

In November 2003, master franchisee, Omni Food Products declared bankruptcy. Top bidder for the franchise was Morag Group at NIS 5.9 million ($1.9 million), however Omni felt the franchise should go to general manager Asaf Greenberg The master franchise was eventually sold to Greenberg as well as two of the main franchise owners.

Despite discontinuing the promotion in the United States due to safety concerns, Domino's in Israel still offer a 30-minute delivery guarantee.

Labor issues
In April 2014 employees protested in several locations around Israel, including outside the CEO's house. In many branches signs were posted saying that Domino's would view those who cancel their union membership as loyal employees. Some branches were reportedly not allowing employees who were union members in to work.

Innovation
In December 2013, Domino's Pizza Israel, was the first Domino's location internationally to unveil vegan pizza, which uses a soy-based cheese substitute.

Kashrut
Despite being located in Israel, a primarily Jewish country, almost none of the chains locations are kosher. By not being kosher, Domino's is able to remain open 7 days a week as well as offering meat toppings and meat products such as wings, which are added to almost a third of the chain's sales. Due to this, Domino's operates mostly in secular areas of Israel where the majority of people do not keep kosher.

Facebook page hijacking
On 14 July 2014, during Operation Protective Edge Hamas hijacked Domino's Pizza Israel's Facebook page to announce they would be firing rockets at Tel Aviv and Haifa.

See also

 Culture of Israel
 Israeli cuisine
 Economy of Israel
 List of pizza chains
 List of restaurants in Israel

References 

Domino's Pizza
Restaurant chains in Israel